Michel P. Samson (born 1972) is a Canadian politician, who represented the electoral district of Cape Breton-Richmond, formerly Richmond in the Nova Scotia House of Assembly from 1998 to 2017. He was a member of the Nova Scotia Liberal Party.

Samson attended Isle Madame District High School and graduated with a B.A. from Dalhousie University in 1994 and a LL.B. from Dalhousie Law School in 1997.  Samson articled with the Halifax law firm of Blois, Nickerson & Bryson and he was admitted to the Nova Scotia in 1998 before working as an associate at the Port Hawkesbury law firm of Macdonald, Boudrot & Doucet.

Political career
In 1998 Samson successfully ran for the Nova Scotia Liberal Party nomination in the riding of Richmond.  He was elected in the 1998 provincial election. In December 1998, Samson was appointed to the Executive Council of Nova Scotia where he served as Minister of the Environment as well as Minister responsible for administration of the Youth Secretariat Act. At the time, he was the youngest person ever to be appointed to the Executive Council of Nova Scotia.

Samson was re-elected in the 1999, 2003, 2006 and 2013 provincial elections.

Samson served as interim leader of the Nova Scotia Liberal Party from 2006-2007 following the resignation of Francis MacKenzie until Stephen McNeil was elected leader; Samson having decided not to pursue the leadership.

On October 22, 2013, Samson was appointed to the Executive Council of Nova Scotia to serve as Minister of Economic and Rural Development and Tourism as well as Minister of Acadian Affairs. In March 2015, Samson was sworn-in as Minister of Energy following the resignation from cabinet of Andrew Younger.

In the 2017 election, Samson was defeated by Progressive Conservative candidate Alana Paon.

Electoral record

 

 

|-

|Liberal
|Michel Samson
|align="right"|4369
|align="right"|56.51
|align="right"|
|-

|Progressive Conservative
|Joe Janega
|align="right"|1696
|align="right"|21.93
|align="right"|
|-

|New Democratic Party
|Bert Lewis
|align="right"|1667
|align="right"|21.56
|align="right"|
|}

|-

|-
 
|New Democratic Party
|Clair Rankin
|align="right"|1477
|align="right"|25.31
|align="right"|+15.88
|-
 
|Progressive Conservative
|John Greene
|align="right"|1045
|align="right"|17.91
|align="right"|-22.65
|-

|}

|-
 
|Liberal
|Michel Samson
|align="right"|2722
|align="right"|48.55
|align="right"|
|-
 
|Progressive Conservative
|John Greene
|align="right"|2268
|align="right"|40.56
|align="right"|
|-
 
|New Democratic Party
|Mary Pat Cude 
|align="right"|529
|align="right"|9.43
|align="right"|
|-

|}

|-
 
|Liberal
|Michel Samson
|align="right"|3047
|align="right"|51.36
|align="right"|
|-
 
|Progressive Conservative
|Richie Cotton
|align="right"|1850
|align="right"|31.18
|align="right"|
|-
 
|New Democratic Party
|Clair Rankin
|align="right"|1036
|align="right"|17.46
|align="right"|
|}

|-
 
|Liberal
|Michel Samson
|align="right"|3105
|align="right"|
|align="right"|
|-
 
|Progressive Conservative
|Joseph MacPhee
|align="right"|1905
|align="right"|
|align="right"|
|-
 
|New Democratic Party
|Wilma Conrod
|align="right"|1595
|align="right"|
|align="right"|
|}

|-

|-
 
|Progressive Conservative
|Joseph MacPhee
|align="right"|1,905
|align="right"|
|align="right"|
|-
 
|New Democratic Party
|Wilma Conrod
|align="right"|1,595
|align="right"|
|align="right"|
|}

See also
 2007 Nova Scotia Liberal Party leadership election

References

External links
 Members of the Nova Scotia Legislative Assembly
 Liberal caucus profile

1972 births
Nova Scotia Liberal Party MLAs
Schulich School of Law alumni
Acadian people
Living people
Members of the Executive Council of Nova Scotia
People from Richmond County, Nova Scotia
21st-century Canadian politicians
Nova Scotia political party leaders